The 2019 Miami Hurricanes baseball team represented the University of Miami during the 2019 NCAA Division I baseball season. The Hurricanes played their home games at Alex Rodriguez Park at Mark Light Field as a member of the Atlantic Coast Conference. They are led by head coach Gino DiMare, in his 19th year at Miami and first year as the head coach.

Roster

Coaching Staff

2019 MLB draft

References

Miami Hurricanes baseball team
Miami Hurricanes
Miami Hurricanes baseball seasons
Miami